Alasdair Worsfold Maclay (born 15 October 1973) is an English former first-class cricketer.

Maclay was born at Salisbury in October 1973. He was educated at Winchester College, before going up to St Edmund Hall, Oxford. While studying at Oxford, he played first-class cricket for Oxford University from 1993–96, making twelve appearances. Playing as a right-arm medium-fast bowler, he took 11 wickets at an average of 78.81 and best figures of 3 for 30.

After graduating from Oxford, he spent eighteen years working in the financial services industry in London and South Africa, before working for The Rhodes Trust as the director of strategy and development where his focus was on expanding the Rhodes Scholarship to new geographic regions. Maclay is currently the chief funds officer of the Global Steering Group for Impact Investment.

References

External links

1973 births
Living people
People from Salisbury
People educated at Winchester College
Alumni of St Edmund Hall, Oxford
English cricketers
Oxford University cricketers
English businesspeople